Sayed Abdul Halim Shah (born 1 January 1973) is a First-class and List A cricketer from Bangladesh. He was a star with the Bangladesh U-19 side in the late 1980s. He failed to fulfill his early promise of a glorious international career but he was a highly respected cricketer in the domestic arena.

He made his first-class debut for Dhaka Metropolis in the 2000/01 season. He then played for Dhaka Division from 2001/02 to 2004/05. A right-handed batsman and occasional off-break bowler he scored 2 first-class hundreds and 7 fifties, with a best of 161* against Barisal Division.

References 

Bangladeshi cricketers
Dhaka Division cricketers
1973 births
Living people
Dhaka Metropolis cricketers